The women's 3000 metres steeplechase event at the 2007 World Championships in Athletics took place on August 25, 2007 (heats) and August 27, 2007 (final) at the Nagai Stadium in Osaka, Japan. The first four of each heat (Q) plus the three fastest times (q) qualified for the final.

Medallists

Records

Results

Final

Qualification

Heat 1

Heat 2

Heat 3

References
Official results, heats - IAAF.org
Official results, final - IAAF.org
Event report - IAAF.org

3000 metres steeplechase
Steeplechase at the World Athletics Championships
2007 in women's athletics